Old Home Town is the thirty-ninth album by American singer/guitarist Glen Campbell, released in 1982 (see 1982 in music).  It was his first album released on Atlantic Records after twenty years with Capitol Records.

Track listing

Side 1:

 "Old Home Town" (David Pomeranz) – 3:38
 "I Love How You Love Me" (Barry Mann, Larry Kolber) – 2:29
 "Hang On Baby (Ease My Mind)" (Joe Rainey, Dan Rogers) – 2:28
 "Blues (My Naughty Sweetie Gives To Me)"  (Arthur N. Swanstone, Charles R. McCarron, Carey Morgan) – 2:30
 "A Few Good Men" (Joe Rainey) – 3:05

Side 2:

 "On the Wings of My Victory" (Bob Corbin) – 3:30
 "I Was Too Busy Loving You" (Jimmy Webb) – 3:08
 "Ruth" (Jud Strunk) – 2:57
 "A Woman's Touch" (Jerry Fuller) – 3:12
 "Mull of Kintyre" (Paul McCartney, Denny Laine) – 4:18

Personnel

Glen Campbell – vocals, acoustic guitar, bagpipes
Kim Darigan – bass guitar, background vocals
Craig Fall – acoustic guitars and electric guitars, background vocals
Steve Hardin – keyboards, harmonica, background vocals
Carl Jackson – acoustic guitar, fiddle, banjo, background vocals
TJ Kuenster – keyboards, synthesizer, background vocals
Steve Turner – drums, background vocals
Larry Muhoberac – keyboards, background vocals
Additional backing vocals – Chris Brosius, Jerry Fuller, Annette Fuller, Joey Scarbury, Joe Benzet, Terry Klein

Production
Producer – Jerry Fuller
Engineer –  Marc Piscitelle
Recording - Marc Piscitelle, Linda Corbin
String Arrangements – Larry Muhoberac
Art Direction – Bob Defrin

Chart performance

Album

Singles

References

Glen Campbell albums
1982 albums
Albums arranged by Larry Muhoberac
Atlantic Records albums